This is a bibliography of American game designer and author Gary Gygax.

Miniature games, board games and rule variants 

 Alexander the Great (1971)
 Chainmail (1971) with Jeff Perren
 Dunkirk: The Battle of France (1971)
 Tractics (1971) with Mike Reese and Leon Tucker 
 Don't Give Up the Ship! (1972) with Dave Arneson and Mike Carr
 Cavaliers and Roundheads (1973) with Jeff Perren
 Warriors of Mars (1974) with Brian Blume
 Classic Warfare (1975)
 Dungeon! (1975) with David R. Megarry, Michael Gray, Steve Winter and S. Schwab
 Little Big Horn: Custer's Last Stand (1976)
 Dragonchess (1985, Dragon Magazine #100)

Role-playing games 

 Dungeons & Dragons (1974) with Dave Arneson
 Boot Hill (1975) with Brian Blume and Don Kaye
 Advanced Dungeons & Dragons:
 Monster Manual (1977)
 Players Handbook (1978)
 Dungeon Masters Guide (1979)
 Cyborg Commando (1987) with Frank Mentzer and Kim Mohan
 Gary Gygax's Dangerous Journeys:
 Mythus (1992)
 Mythus Prime (1994)
 Lejendary Adventure:
 The Lejendary Rules for All Players (1999)
 The Beasts of Lejend (2000)
 The Lejend Master's Lore (2000)
 Essentials (2005)

Supplements 

 D&D supplement I: Greyhawk (1975) with Robert Kuntz
 D&D supplement III: Eldritch Wizardry (1976)  with Brian Blume
 Dungeon Geomorphs (1976)
 D&D supplement V: Swords & Spells (1976)
 Outdoor Geomorphs (1977)
 World of Greyhawk Fantasy Game Setting (1980)
 AD&D Monster Manual II (1983)
 AC4 The Book of Marvelous Magic (1985) with Frank Mentzer
 AD&D Unearthed Arcana (1985)
 AD&D Oriental Adventures (1985)
 Gary Gygax's Dangerous Journeys:
 Mythus Magick (1992)
 The Epic of Aerth (1992)
 Necropolis and the Land of Aegypt (1992)
 Mythus Bestiary (1993)
Lejendary Earth World Setting:
 Lejendary Earth Gazetteer (2002)
 Noble Knights and Dark Lands (2003) with Chris Clark
 The Exotic Realms of Hazgar (2006) with Chris Clark
 d20 System:
 The Slayer's Guide to Dragons (2002) with Jon Creffield
 The Slayer's Guide to Undead (2002) with Jon Creffield
 Gygaxian Fantasy Worlds:
 Gary Gygax's the Canting Crew (2002)
 Gary Gygax's World Builder (2003)
 Gary Gygax's Living Fantasy (2003)
 Castles & Crusades:
 CZ1 Castle Zagyg: Yggsburgh (2005)
 CZ9 The East Mark Gazetteer (2007)  with Jeffrey P. Talanian
 CZ2 Castle Zagyg: The Upper Works (2008) with Jeffrey P. Talanian

Adventure modules 

 S1 Tomb of Horrors (1975, 1978)
 S3 Expedition to the Barrier Peaks (1976, 1980)
 S4 The Lost Caverns of Tsojcanth (1976, 1982)
 G1 Steading of the Hill Giant Chief (1978)
 G2 Glacial Rift of the Frost Giant Jarl (1978)
 G3 Hall of the Fire Giant King (1978)
 D1 Descent into the Depths of the Earth (1978)
 D2 Shrine of the Kuo-Toa (1978)
 D3 Vault of the Drow (1978)
 Q1 Queen of the Demonweb Pits (1978)
 T1 Village of Hommlet (1979)
 B2 The Keep on the Borderlands (1979)
 GW1 Legion of Gold (1980) Gamma World adventure module, with Luke Gygax and Paul Reiche III
 WG4 The Forgotten Temple of Tharizdun (1982)
 EX1 Dungeonland (1983)
 EX2 The Land Beyond the Magic Mirror (1983)
 WG5 Mordenkainen's Fantastic Adventure (1984) with Robert Kuntz
 WG6 Isle of the Ape (1985)
 T1-4 The Temple of Elemental Evil (1985) with Frank Mentzer
 GDQ1-7 Queen of the Spiders (1986)
 Pulp Dungeons: Uninvited Guests (1997) with Lester Smith and Bryan Winter
 A Challenge of Arms - the Wolfmoon Adventure Module #1 (1998) with Christopher Clark
 The Ritual of the Golden Eyes - the Wolfmoon Adventure Module #2 (1998) with Christopher Clark
 d20 Sword & Sorcery: Gary Gygax's Necropolis (2002)
 d20 system: Gary Gygax's the Hermit (2002)
 Lejendary Adventure - Terekaptra: Lost City of the Utiss (2004)
 d20 system: Gary Gygax's Hall of Many Panes (2005)
 Lejendary Adventure - Living the Legend (2006)

Other role-playing game related subjects 
 The Official Advanced Dungeons & Dragons Coloring Album (1979)
 Hero's Challenge - Sagard the Barbarian gamebook:
 The Ice Dragon (1985) with Flint Dille
 The Green Hydra (1985) with Flint Dille
 The Crimson Sea (1985) with Flint Dille
 The Fire Demon (1986) with Flint Dille
 Role-Playing Mastery (1987)
 Master of the Game (1989)
 The Weyland Smith & Company Giant Fun Catalog (1999)
 Horsemen of the Apocalypse: Essays on Roleplaying (2000)
 with Jim Dietz, Richard Garfield, Greg Costikyan, Marc Miller, Matt Forbeck, Greg Stafford and Rick Loomis

Novels 

 Greyhawk Adventure/Gord the Rogue series:
 Saga of Old City (1985)
 Artifact of Evil (1986)
 Sea of Death (1987)
 Night Arrant (1987, short stories)
 City of Hawks (1987)
 Come Endless Darkness (1988)
 Dance of Demons (1988)
 Dangerous Journeys novels:
 The Anubis Murders (1992)
 The Samarkand Solution (1993)
 Death in Delhi (1993)
 Infernal Sorceress (2008)

References
 "Empire of Imagination: Gary Gygax and the Birth of Dungeons & Dragons" - Witwer, Michael; Bloomsbury USA; First edition hardcover (2015) 
 
 The Gygaxian Vault - Biography/Bibliography

Gygax, Gary
Gygax, Gary
Gygax, Gary